Laura Margaret Hope (née Fowler) (3 May 1868 – 14 September 1952) was the first woman to graduate in medicine and surgery at the University of Adelaide and Australia's first woman surgeon. With her husband Charles she devoted over thirty years to medical and Baptist missionary work in Bengal and Serbia.

Early life
Laura Margaret Fowler was born in the Adelaide suburb of Mitcham, South Australia to Scottish born parents George Swan Fowler and Catherine Janet Lamb. As a child, she helped her father, a successful wholesale grocer, to breed leeches for sale to pharmacists on the family's estate in Glen Osmond.

Education
Fowler was educated privately, initially attending Madame Marval's private school in Adelaide as well as schools in England while her brother attended Cambridge University.  The family returned to Adelaide in 1884 and Fowler matriculated in 1886.

In 1887 Fowler became the first woman to enroll in medicine at the University of Adelaide.  She was awarded the Elder Prize and graduated in Medicine and Surgery in 1891.

Career
Fowler was appointed the House Surgeon at the Adelaide Children's Hospital where she worked until her marriage in 1893 to fellow doctor Charles Henry Standish Hope.

Following their marriage, Laura and Charles Hope spent many years working on missions in India, particularly in Bengal where they would spend 30 years providing medical assistance to the local community. The couple frequently treated cases of typhoid, cholera and malaria and Charles became well known for his expertise in performing eye surgery.

In 1915 the Hopes served in World War I as doctors in the Scottish Women's Hospitals for Foreign Service (as the Australian Army would not enlist female doctors, only female nurses). The Hopes treated wounded soldiers in  Kragujevac, Serbia where they were captured and imprisoned in Hungary for two months. Following a period of respite in England, they returned to India and their mission efforts in 1916. Both were awarded the Serbian Samaritan Cross in 1918.

Prior to moving back to Adelaide with her husband for retirement, Laura Hope received the Kaisar-i-Hind medal for her missionary work. The Hopes did mission work at the Australian Baptist Mission at Pubna, the New Zealand Baptist Misson Hospital, Chandpur, India, and the Bengal Baptist Mission at Kalimpong.

Death
Hope died on 14 September 1952 and had no children. Her husband predeceased her in 1942.

References

1868 births
1952 deaths
Australian surgeons
Australian women scientists
University of Adelaide alumni
Women surgeons
Scottish Women's Hospitals for Foreign Service volunteers
19th-century Australian women
20th-century Australian women
Australian people of Scottish descent
19th-century Australian medical doctors
20th-century Australian medical doctors
Australian expatriates in India
World War I prisoners of war held by Austria-Hungary